The year 1622 in music involved some significant events.

Events 
January 6 (probable) – The Masque of Augurs, written by Ben Jonson and designed by Inigo Jones, is performed at Whitehall Palace, probably to celebrate Twelfth Night. The masque features music by Alfonso Ferrabosco the younger and Nicholas Lanier (but only one song by Lanier will survive).
Lutenist Jacques Gaultier begins his correspondence with composer Constantijn Huygens.

Classical music 
Adriano Banchieri – , Cantatas for five voices and a harpsichord or theorbo, Op. 46 (Venice: Bartolomeo Magni)
Giacinto Bondioli
, Op. 4 (Venice: Bartolomeo Magni for Gardano)
 (Sweet flowers cultivated in the pleasant garden), Op. 5 (Venice: Bartolomeo Magni), a collection of sacred music for two voices and continuo
Christoph Demantius
,  for six voices (Freiberg: Georg Hoffmann), an epithalamium for the wedding of Matthaeus Heinrich and Justitia
 for six voices (Freiberg: Georg Hoffmann), an epithalamium for the wedding of Johann Caspar and Victoria on May 6
Ignazio Donati – Masses for four, five, and six voices (Venice: Alessandro Vincenti)
Giacomo Finetti –  (Mary's Crown) for four voices, book five (Venice: Bartolomeo Magni for Gardano), a collection of motets
Melchior Franck
, parts one to four, for four, five, six, and eight voices (Coburg: Andreas Forckel for Salomon Gruner), a collection of Magnificats in all eight tones
 for four voices (Coburg: Andreas Forckel for Salomon Gruner), a collection of quodlibets, both previously published and original
 for five voices (Coburg: Andreas Forckel), a funeral motet
  for six voices (Coburg: Andreas Forckel), a motet for the funeral of Duke Frederick of Saxe-Weimar
Marco da Gagliano – Second book of motets for one to six voices (Venice: Bartolomeo Magni for Gardano)
Vinko Jelić –  for one, two, three, and four voices or instruments with organ bass, Op. 1 (Strassbourg: Paul Lederz)
Carlo Milanuzzi
 for four and eight voices with basso continuo, Op. 5 (Venice: Alessandro Vincenti)
 for five voices and organ bass, Op. 6 (Venice: Alessandro Vincenti)
Pomponio Nenna –  for five voices with organ bass (Rome: Giovanni Battista Robletti), published posthumously
Salamone Rossi – 
Thomas Tomkins – Songs Of 3. 4. 5. and 6. parts

Opera 
Francesca Caccini –  (The martyrdom of Saint Agata)

Births 
date unknown 
James Clifford, churchman and musician (died 1698) 
Gaspar de Verlit, composer (died 1682)
Alba Trissina, Italian composer.

Deaths 
January 1 – Jakob Hassler, composer (born 1569)
February 11 – Alfonso Fontanelli, composer and writer (born 1557)
April 15 – Pietro Pace, composer (born 1559)
October 26 – Sebastián de Vivanco, priest and composer (born c.1551)
November – Giovanni Battista Grillo, organist and composer
date unknown – Giovanni Paolo Cima, organist and composer (born c. 1570)

 
Music
17th century in music
Music by year